The Men's time trial of the 2014 UCI Road World Championships was a cycling event that took place on 24 September 2014 in Ponferrada, Spain. The 21st edition of the championship was won by reigning Olympic time trial champion, Bradley Wiggins. Germany's Tony Martin – the three-time defending champion – claimed silver, and Tom Dumoulin of the Netherlands claimed bronze.

Qualification

All National Federations were allowed to enter four riders for the race, with a maximum of two riders to start. In addition to this number, the outgoing World Champion and the current continental champions were also able to take part.

Course
The initial plan was to have a time trial finishing uphill. This idea was discarded because it was required to have two finish sections which was not possible from a logistical and financial point of view.

The time trial started in the centre of Ponferrada and passed through La Martina, Posada del Bierzo and Carracedelo before returning to Ponferrada. A short stretch before riding into Ponferrada was made for the championships. The course started with a flat section of  through the valley of Bierzo, before the parcours rose slightly. The ascent overlapped partly with the road race for men, which meant that the steepest part had a negative gradient of 16%. After  there was another climb; in a few kilometres the riders reached the highest point in the route, located at  after , before a downhill run to the finish.

Schedule
All times are in Central European Time (UTC+1).

Participating nations
64 cyclists from 38 nations took part in the men's time trial. The number of cyclists per nation is shown in parentheses.

  Argentina (1)
  Australia (1)
  Austria (2)
  Azerbaijan (1)
  Belgium (2)
  Belarus (2)
  Canada (1)
  Chile (1)
  Colombia (1)
  Czech Republic (2)
  Denmark (2)
  Ecuador (1)
  Estonia (2)
  France (2)
  Great Britain (2)
  Germany (3)
  Hungary (2)
  Ireland (1)
  Italy (2)
  Kazakhstan (2)
  Latvia (2)
  Lithuania (2)
  Moldova (1)
  Macedonia (2)
  Netherlands (1)
  New Zealand (1)
  Norway (2)
  Paraguay (1)
  Poland (2)
  Portugal (2)
  Romania (2)
  Russia (2)
  Slovenia (2)
  Spain (2) (host)
  Sweden (2)
  Switzerland (1)
  Ukraine (2)
  United States (2)

Prize money
The UCI assigned premiums for the top 3 finishers with a total prize money of €7,766.

Final classification

References

Men's time trial
UCI Road World Championships – Men's time trial
2014 in men's road cycling